Kyttälä is a district in Tampere, Finland. It was born in the late 1870s as a working-class neighborhood to the eastern outskirts of the town. As Tampere soon expanded, Kyttälä is now a part of the city center between the Tammerkoski river and the railway. Population of Kyttälä is 3,348 (31 December 2014). Aleksanterinkatu is one of Kyttälä's main streets. The direct connection to the Liisankallio district and from there to Teiskontie and Sammonkatu streets runs along Itsenäisyydenkatu and connection to the Jussinkylä district  runs along Tuomiokirkonkatu.

Notable sights 
Tampere Orthodox Church
Hotel Tammer
Tampere railway station
Hotel Ilves
Koskikeskus (shopping centre)
Posteljooninpuisto
Sori Square

See also 
 Ratina (district)
 Tulli (district)

References